Kourosh Rajoli (born january 19, 1985) is an Iranian taekwondo athlete. He is a double gold medalist at the Asian Taekwondo Championships and a bronze medalist at the 2011 World Taekwondo Championships.
In the 2006 Asian Taekwondo Championships's final, he defeated Choi Seong-Ho and in the 2008 Asian Taekwondo Championships's final, he overcame Yuan Ming-Che.

References 

Living people
1985 births
Iranian male taekwondo practitioners
Place of birth missing (living people)
21st-century Iranian people